Armando Francioli (21 October 1919 – 6 April 2020) was an Italian actor. He appeared in over 50 films since 1942.

Selected filmography

References

External links 

1919 births
2020 deaths
Male actors from Rome
Italian centenarians
Italian male film actors
Men centenarians